Kofi Amoako popularly known as DJ Vyrusky is a Ghanaian disc jockey, he was the Commercial Media Manager at EchoHouse, before he becoming a full-time DJ on Starr Drive in 2014. He is currently the 2017 Ghana DJ Awards Best DJ of the Year and Best DJ from the Ghana Music Honors.

Education 

He completed the University of Ghana Business School with BSc. administration (insurance option) and a master's degree in risk management and insurance from the same institution. DJ Vyrusky attended St. Thomas Aquinas Secondary School for his high school education as a science student.

Musical career

The beginning 
In a career that started on the University of Ghana campus as a drink-up DJ, DJ Vyrusky was the resident DJ at University of Ghana's student's hangout joint, TymeOut where he doubled as the in-house DJ for all EchoHouse  and Lynx Entertainment events.

Between 2010 and 2011 as a final year student at the University of Ghana Business School, he started playing outside campus and perfected his art through competitions with other campus DJs and friends.

Breakthrough 
By 2013, DJ Vyrusky had started making waves outside campus and was the resident DJ at Club 45 now Gold Coast Restaurant. At Club 45, he won the award for Discovery of the Year in the maiden Ghana DJ Awards 2014.

He followed it up with Event DJ and Club DJ the next year at the Ghana DJ Awards in 2014/2015  and moved into full-time DJing at Starr FM where he initially played on Club Arena with DJ French Kiss and hosts, Nii Ayi and Bianca Buckman before moving to Starr Drive with Bola Ray. At the 2017 edition of Ghana Music Honors, he was awarded the Best DJ Honors award.

Artiste DJ 
Late 2015, he became the official DJ for MzVee and traveled with her across the country. In the same period, he won the Event DJ of the Year at the Ghana DJ Awards. He was also picked as the artiste DJ for Shatta Wale in early 2016 and toured with the artiste on his UK Tour.He has many hits in the Ghana music industry.

Debut single 
As a DJ, Vyrusky is known for his signature use of authentic Ghanaian music like highlife for mixes and has perfected over the years to produce his debut single 'Number'. Featuring Kojo Cue and Kuami Eugene, the single is a blends the beauty of Ghanaian highlife with hiplife.

Shows 
DJ Vyrusky successfully hosted his first show at the St. Thomas Aquinas SHS to talk about the abuse of drugs.

Awards and nominations

Notable performances
 Epilogo, 2017
 Vodafone VIM Launch, 2017
 Ghana Rocks, 2016
 Ovation Red Party, 2016
 Ghana Meets Naija, 2016 and 2017
 Fresh a’ Fair, 2016
 First Atlantic Bank, Purple Ball 2015 and 2016
 Tidal Rave, 2011-2016
 Vodafone X Concerts, 2015-2016
 Tigo Switch Concerts, 2014
Vac With DJ Vyrusky

Discography

Singles

2018 

 Never Carry Last ft. Mayorkun x Kuami Eugene

2017 
 Number ft. Ko-Jo Cue and Kuami Eugene
 Adwenfi ft. Shatta Wale and Kuami Eugene

Mixes

2014 
 Muse I
 Muse II

2015 
 1957 Volume I
 Skolom Ay3late Mix
 Hello Hotline

2016 
 1957 Volume II
 Thank You Mix
 Timmy Cut
 Tidal Rave Mix
 Cabana Mix

References

Ghanaian DJs
Living people
University of Ghana alumni
Year of birth missing (living people)